The variational multiscale method (VMS) is a technique used for deriving models and numerical methods for multiscale phenomena. The VMS framework has been mainly applied to design stabilized finite element methods in which stability of the standard Galerkin method is not ensured both in terms of singular perturbation and of compatibility conditions with the finite element spaces.

Stabilized methods are getting increasing attention in computational fluid dynamics because they are designed to solve drawbacks typical of the standard Galerkin method: advection-dominated flows problems and problems in which an arbitrary combination of interpolation functions may yield to unstable discretized formulations. The milestone of stabilized methods for this class of problems can be considered the Streamline Upwind Petrov-Galerkin method (SUPG), designed during 80s for convection dominated-flows for the incompressible Navier–Stokes equations by Brooks and Hughes. Variational Multiscale Method (VMS) was introduced by Hughes in 1995. Broadly speaking, VMS is a technique used to get mathematical models and numerical methods which are able to catch multiscale phenomena; in fact, it is usually adopted for problems with huge scale ranges, which are separated into a number of scale groups.

The abstract framework

Abstract Dirichlet problem with variational formulation

Consider an open bounded domain  with smooth boundary , being  the number of space dimensions. Denoting with  a generic, second order, nonsymmetric differential operator, consider the following boundary value problem:  

being  and  given functions. Let   be the Hilbert space of square-integrable functions with square-integrable derivatives: 

Consider the trial solution space  and the weighting function space   defined as follows:

The variational formulation of the boundary value problem defined above reads:

,

Variational multiscale method

In VMS approach, the function spaces are decomposed through a multiscale direct sum decomposition for both  and  into coarse and fine scales subspaces as:
 
and

,

In particular, the following assumptions are made on these functions:

With this in mind, the variational form can be rewritten as

Last equation, yields to a coarse scale and a fine scale problem:

or, equivalently, considering that   and :

which shows that the fine scale solution  depends on the strong residual of the coarse scale equation . The fine scale solution can be expressed in terms of  through the Green's function :

Let  be the Dirac delta function, by definition, the Green's function is found by solving 

Moreover, it is possible to express  in terms of a new differential operator  that approximates the differential operator  as  

In order to eliminate the explicit dependence in the coarse scale equation of the sub-grid scale terms, considering the definition of the dual operator, the last expression can be substituted in the second term of the coarse scale equation: 

The coarse problem is therefore rewritten as: 

being 

Introducing the form  
 
and the functional 
, 
the VMS formulation of the coarse scale equation is rearranged as: 

and

The VMS problem with Finite Element approximation reads: 
 
or, equivalently:

VMS and stabilized methods 

Consider an advection–diffusion problem: 

The variational form of the problem above reads: 

being

The standard Galerkin formulation of this problem reads

Consider a strongly consistent stabilization method of the problem above in a finite element framework: 

for a suitable form  that satisfies: 

In 1995, Thomas J.R. Hughes showed that a stabilized method of multiscale type can be viewed as a sub-grid scale model where the stabilization parameter is equal to 

or, in terms of the Green's function as

which yields the following definition of :

VMS turbulence modeling for large-eddy simulations of incompressible flows 

The idea of VMS turbulence modeling for Large Eddy Simulations(LES) of incompressible Navier–Stokes equations was introduced by Hughes et al. in 2000 and the main idea was to use - instead of classical filtered techniques - variational projections.

Incompressible Navier–Stokes equations 
Consider the incompressible Navier–Stokes equations for a Newtonian fluid of constant density  in a domain  with boundary , being  and  portions of the boundary where respectively a Dirichlet and a Neumann boundary condition  is applied:

Let  be the dynamic viscosity of the fluid,  the second order identity tensor and  the strain-rate tensor defined as: 

Global space time variational formulation 

In order to find a variational formulation of the Navier–Stokes equations, consider the following infinite-dimensional spaces: 

The weak form of the unsteady-incompressible Navier–Stokes equations reads: given ,

where  represents the  inner product and  the  inner product. Moreover, the bilinear forms ,  and the trilinear form  are defined as follows:

Finite element method for space discretization and VMS-LES modeling
In order to discretize in space the Navier–Stokes equations, consider the function space of finite element

of piecewise Lagrangian Polynomials of degree  over the domain  triangulated with a mesh  made of tetrahedrons of diameters , . 
Following the approach shown above, let introduce a multiscale direct-sum decomposition of the space  which represents either  and :

being 

the finite dimensional function space associated to the coarse scale, and 

the infinite-dimensional fine scale function space, with 
, 
 
and 
. 
An overlapping sum decomposition is then defined as:

By using the decomposition above in the variational form of the Navier–Stokes equations, one gets a coarse and a fine scale equation; the fine scale terms appearing in the coarse scale equation are integrated by parts and the fine scale variables are modeled as:

while the stabilization parameters are set equal to:

The semi-discrete variational multiscale multiscale formulation (VMS-LES) of the incompressible Navier–Stokes equations, reads: given ,

being 

and

From the expressions above, one can see that: 
 the form  contains the standard terms of the Navier–Stokes equations in variational formulation; 
 the form  contain four terms: 
 the first term is the classical SUPG stabilization term; 
 the second term represents a stabilization term additional to the SUPG one; 
 the third term is a stabilization term typical of the VMS modeling; 
 the fourth term is peculiar of the LES modeling, describing the Reynolds cross-stress.

See also 
 Navier–Stokes equations
 Large eddy simulation
 Finite element method
 Backward differentiation formula
 Computational fluid dynamics
 Streamline upwind Petrov–Galerkin pressure-stabilizing Petrov–Galerkin formulation for incompressible Navier–Stokes equations

References

Mathematical modeling
Numerical analysis
Computational fluid dynamics